Julia M. McNamara is a scholar of French literature, an academic administrator, and a former nun. She served as president of Albertus Magnus College in New Haven from 1982 to 2016.

McNamara grew up in Queens, New York and attended Dominican Academy. She earned degrees from Ohio Dominican University and Middlebury College before completing her PhD in French at Yale University, with a dissertation on Julien Green. A member of the Dominican Sisters of Peace until 1987, she joined the faculty of Albertus Magnus, founded by the order, in 1976, and became a dean there in 1980. She presided over a thorough transformation of the college, beginning with the admission of men for the first time in 1985. She also expanded the college's fundraising efforts, succeeding in significantly adding to its endowment. She retired in 2016.

Outside of Albertus, McNamara has served on the board of Yale New Haven Hospital and other local charities. She was the first woman to serve on the Committee  of  the  Proprietors  of  the  Common  and  Undivided  Lands, which oversees the New Haven Green.

References

Living people
Women heads of universities and colleges
Dominican nuns
Albertus Magnus College faculty
Year of birth missing (living people)